Edward John Lessimore (20 January 1881 – 7 March 1960) born in Barton Regis, Gloucestershire was a British sport shooter who competed in the 1912 Summer Olympics.

In 1912 he won the gold medal with the British team in the team 50 metre small-bore rifle competition. In the 50 metre rifle, prone event he finished fourth and in the 25 metre small-bore rifle competition he finished 12th.

References

External links
profile

1881 births
1960 deaths
British male sport shooters
ISSF rifle shooters
Olympic shooters of Great Britain
Shooters at the 1912 Summer Olympics
English Olympic medallists
Olympic gold medallists for Great Britain
Olympic medalists in shooting
Medalists at the 1912 Summer Olympics
20th-century British people